Big Walter Price (August 2, 1917 − March 7, 2012) was an American blues singer, songwriter and pianist.

Born near Gonzales, Texas, he moved to San Antonio, where he released his first song called "Calling Margie" in 1955. In 1955 he moved to Houston, where he lived until his death. In the 1960s he signed with Peacock Records and released several of his singles. His song "Pack Fair and Square" was covered by the J. Geils Band on the J. Geils Band album.

He died in 2012 aged 94 (though he claimed 97).

References

External links

 Big Walter Price on AllMusic
 Big Walter Price on MySpace

1917 births
2012 deaths
People from Gonzales County, Texas
American blues pianists
American male pianists
American blues singers
American blues singer-songwriters
Singer-songwriters from Texas
20th-century American pianists
20th-century American male musicians
American male singer-songwriters